Ayer Keroh (Jawi: ايير كروه) is a town situated in Melaka Tengah District, Malacca, Malaysia. It is the seat of the state government since 2006, being the home of the state secretariat building complex – Seri Negeri complex and one of a few towns which formed the Hang Tuah Jaya municipality.

Economy
Ayer Keroh houses two main industrial areas: the Ayer Keroh Industrial Area (State-owned), which includes the Mamee Double-Decker headquarters and manufacturing plant and Taman Tasik Utama Industrial Area (Private).

Education

Politics

Public health

Sports and recreation

Tourist attractions
The town is a major tourist spot of the state, apart from the old Malacca City, due to its recent hosting of various interesting attractions. List of tourist attractions here are:

Transportation
The Ayer Keroh toll is the main entry point into Malacca state using the North South Expressway. This makes it easily accessible from any part of Peninsular Malaysia. The town is about 2 hours drive from Kuala Lumpur and one hour from Seremban. Ayer Keroh is also about 3 hours drive from Singapore. Lebuh Ayer Keroh (Federal Route 143), the town's main dual-carriageway highway, connects state capital Malacca City to the North–South Expressway via Ayer Keroh Interchange.

Gallery

References

 
Central Melaka District